Drive is a British reality game show that aired on ITV from 5 April to 3 May 2016. It is hosted by Vernon Kay with Jason Plato as the pundit and James Allen as the commentator.

Celebrities

Episodes

† Deayton was eliminated second, but returned following the withdrawal of Mariella Frostup.

References

External links
 

2016 British television series debuts
2016 British television series endings
2010s British game shows
2010s British reality television series
English-language television shows
ITV game shows
Television series by ITV Studios